Rodney "Pete" Anderson (born July 9, 1931) is an American politician. He served as a Republican member of the Wyoming House of Representatives, representing the 10th district.

Biography
Anderson was born in Kimball, Nebraska. He attended Bethel College from 1949 to 1950, John Brown University from 1950 to 1951, and the University of Wyoming from 1951 to 1953. He worked as a farmer/rancher, and served in the 82nd Airborne Division from 1953 to 1955.

Anderson was the President of Anderson Livestock from 1965 to 1996, and President of D.R.W. Incorporated from 1970 to 2004. He was a member of the Wyoming House of Representatives from 1992 to 2010. He served as Majority Whip in the State House from 2001 to 2002. He served as Chairman of the Revenue Committee and Select Water Committee.

Anderson and his wife reside in Pine Bluffs, Wyoming.

See also
 XVIII Airborne Corps (United States)
 82nd Airborne Division

References

External links 
 Wyoming State Legislature - Representative Rodney Anderson WY Senate official website
 Project Vote Smart - Representative Rodney Anderson (WY) profile
 Follow the Money - Rodney Anderson
 2006
 2004
 2002
 2000
 1998
 1996
 1994
 1992 campaign contributions

People from Kimball, Nebraska
People from Laramie County, Wyoming
Republican Party members of the Wyoming House of Representatives
1931 births
Living people
United States Army soldiers
John Brown University alumni
University of Wyoming alumni